Night Heat is a Canadian police crime drama series that aired on both CTV in Canada and CBS in the United States.  Original episodes were broadcast from 1985 to 1989. Night Heat was the first Canadian original drama series that was also aired on a United States television network during its original broadcast. It was also the first original, first-run drama series to be aired during a late night time slot on a television network in the United States.

During its original run it was the highest-rated Canadian-produced original series in Canada. The show won the Gemini Award for Best Drama Series in both 1986 and 1987.
 
The show stars Scott Hylands and Jeff Wincott as police detectives Kevin O'Brien and Frank Giambone who work the graveyard shift in an unnamed northeastern North American metropolis. The series follows their nightly police beat as it is chronicled by journalist Tom Kirkwood (Allan Royal) in his newspaper column titled "Night Heat".

Synopsis
Allan Royal plays Tom Kirkwood, a journalist who writes a newspaper column titled "Night Heat" where he chronicles the nightly police beat of detectives Kevin O'Brien, played by Scott Hylands, and Frank Giambone, played by Jeff Wincott. O'Brien is a tough, cynical, veteran police officer and Giambone is his younger, hot-tempered partner. Kirkwood also serves as the show's narrator; his voice-over commentary starts and ends each episode, recapping the lessons learned and acting as a sort of Greek chorus.

The name of the city in which the show takes place is never mentioned.  Each episode represents a single night's shift and, as a result, crimes often remain unresolved by the end of the show.

Cast

Main
 Scott Hylands as Detective Kevin O'Brien
 Jeff Wincott as Detective Frank Giambone
 Allan Royal as columnist Thomas J. Kirkwood
 Sean McCann as Lieutenant James Hogan
 Eugene Clark as Detective Colby Burns
 Stephen Mendel as Detective Freddie Carson
 Susan Hogan as Nichole Rimbaud
 Louise Vallance as Detective Stephanie "Stevie" Brody (season 1)

Recurring
 Wendy Crewson as Prosecutor Dorothy Fredricks (season 1)
 Lynda Mason Green as Detective Fleece Toland (season 1)
 Tony Rosato as Arthur "Whitey" Morelli 
 Clark Johnson as Detective David Jefferson 
 Deborah Grover as Prosecutor Elaine Jeffers
 Laura McKinlay Robinson as Detective Christine Meadows
 Robert Morelli as Joey Sanza

Production

Concept and development
Night Heat was conceived by Sonny Grosso, a former New York City Police Department detective. Grosso served was the show's executive producer along with his partner, Larry Jacobson.

Grosso had over 20 years experience in law enforcement, later working as a narcotics detective. He and his former NYPD partner, Eddie Egan, were the detectives responsible for bringing an end to the infamous drug smuggling ring known as the French Connection. Grosso served as technical adviser on the film based on the investigation.  He also worked as a consultant for the film The Godfather and as story editor for the TV series The Rockford Files, Kojak and Baretta.

Grosso and Jacobson were originally approached by CBS to produce a docudrama series following actual police officers, but they considered the potential risk in filming people who had not yet been convicted of a crime and decided against it. Grosso came up with the idea of creating a police series that would feature a realistic look at police work in a documentary style, similar to the 1950s/1960s police drama Naked City. He wanted to depict the life of the everyday police officer, in contrast to the slicker, high-action, high-drama, yuppie-oriented police series of the time such as Miami Vice and Hill Street Blues. The pilot episode was written by Don Flynn, a crime reporter with the New York Daily News.

Filming

Grosso and Jacobson decided to produce their show in Toronto, Canada, otherwise the production costs would have been too expensive for CBS's late-night budget. At the time one could film in Toronto for less than half the cost of a major American city—Canadian union scale was lower and the American-to-Canadian dollar exchange rate was also favorable. The show featured an all-Canadian cast and crew and was partially funded by the Government of Canada. For Hylands, a 21-year veteran actor, frequently seen playing villains in U.S. TV shows during the 1970s and early 1980s, this was the first time he had been given a leading role, or the role of a "good guy."

The series was shot entirely at night between the hours of 6pm and 4am, which also made it easier to film since there was less traffic and it was easier to close down streets. The lower budget also meant that the show did not contain high speed car chases or shootouts with heavy calibre weapons. As a result, the show was more reliant on story and dialogue to capture audiences.

Night Heat was filmed on 16mm film using hand-held cameras, instead of the Hollywood-standard 35mm film, giving the series a grainy, documentary-style look. Much of the show was shot at the site of the former Lakeshore Psychiatric Hospital, which served as the series' police station; described as a "grim and forbidding setting," the hospital fit in with the gritty look that the show's producer, Robert Lantos wanted.

Filming a police drama aimed at both Canadian and American audiences in an unidentified city presented a unique set of challenges: The crew had to avoid capturing shots of landmarks and other objects that would give away that it was not an American city, such as Toronto Police cars, Esso stations and the CN Tower. While much of the show's dialogue included American law-enforcement terminology (for example: they referred to police "precincts" instead of "divisions", and characters had ranks such as officers, detectives and lieutenants instead of constables, sergeants and inspectors), they avoided terms from the American criminal justice system such as "grand jury" or "district attorney". In addition, the officers were never seen reading Miranda rights to suspects since there is no Miranda law in Canada. The writers also made a concerted effort to avoid using words that Canadians have a distinctive way of pronouncing, such as the words "out" and "about". Given Toronto's relative cleanliness when compared to larger American cities, the film crew would sometimes throw additional garbage onto the set during street scenes. Grosso, Hylands and Jacobson have all said in separate interviews that there was a time when the garbage that they had strewn about for a Night Heat shoot had been cleaned-up by city sanitation crews while the film crew was on break.

Episodes

Series overview

Season 1 (1985–86)

Season 2 (1986–87)

Season 3 (1987–88)

Season 4 (1988–89)

Broadcast
CBS aired Night Heat as part of CBS Late Night, a late-night block of drama programming. It marked the first time in 20 years that CBS had slotted a first-run series against The Tonight Show. For six weeks in the summer of 1987 CBS moved the show to a 9pm slot, making it the first time that a Canadian drama series was shown on a major US network in prime time since Encounter, a short-lived ABC anthology series broadcast live out of the CBC's Toronto studios in the fall of 1958.

In late 1988, CBS announced it had officially canceled Night Heat. In spite of the show's popularity, CBS decided that it could get even better ratings in the late-night timeslot with The Pat Sajak Show, a talk show fronted by Wheel of Fortune host Pat Sajak. Over a fourth of CBS's affiliates expressed more interest in running the Sajak program than continuing to run Night Heat and the last episode aired on CBS in January 1989 even though CTV still had a full season on film that had yet to be aired.

After the series was canceled, reruns continued to air on CBS for another two years, and on Canadian television well into the early 2000s.

Reception

Ratings
Night Heat received good ratings for CBS; the show drew an average of 20% of TV viewers in its timeslot and at times the show even outperformed NBC's The Tonight Show Starring Johnny Carson in such markets as New York, Boston,  Philadelphia and Chicago.

In Canada Night Heat attracted a million viewers a week.  Critics in Canada were generally enthusiastic about Night Heat and were proud of the fact that it was being shown on American television. Critics such as Rick Salutin of The Globe and Mail expressed disappointment that the show hid or downplayed the fact that it was Canadian in order to appeal to US audiences:  "they never say it's Toronto. It's just the city."

Accolades
Night Heat won the award for Best Drama Series at the 1986 Gemini Awards. At the 1987 Gemini Awards the series again won the award for Best Drama Series, actor Eugene Clark won the award for Best Performance by a Supporting Actor and writer Bob Carney won the award for Best Writing in a Dramatic Series for the episode titled "The Hit". Night Heat also won the 1987 Gemini award in the category of TV Guide's Most Popular Program, an award based on ballots submitted by the magazine's readers in Canada.

At the 1988 Gemini Awards writers Tim Dunphy and Peter Mohan won the award for Best Writing in a Dramatic Series and Night Heat again won TV Guide's Most Popular Program award. In 1989 the series writer Chris Haddock won the Gemini Award for Best Writing in a Dramatic Series for the episode titled "False Witness".

References

External links

 
 

CTV Television Network original programming
CBS original programming
1985 Canadian television series debuts
1991 Canadian television series endings
1980s Canadian crime drama television series
1990s Canadian crime drama television series
Television series about journalism
Television shows filmed in Toronto
Television series by Alliance Atlantis
Gemini and Canadian Screen Award for Best Drama Series winners
Detective television series
Canadian police procedural television series